Eric Maurice Smith Jr. (born September 2, 1995) is an American football offensive tackle for the New York Jets of the National Football League (NFL). He played college football at Virginia.

High school career
Smith attended Columbia High School in Decatur, Georgia, where he was a three-star prospect. He committed to attend the University of Virginia in 2012.

College career
Smith started in 32 games at the right tackle position for Virginia. He graduated with a B.A. degree in May 2017.

Professional career

Miami Dolphins
Smith signed with the Miami Dolphins as an undrafted free agent on May 5, 2017. After an impressive preseason, Smith made Miami's 53-man roster as a backup right tackle. He was placed on injured reserve on October 3, 2017. He was activated off injured reserve to the active roster on December 20, 2017.

On September 1, 2018, Smith was waived by the Dolphins.

New England Patriots
On September 3, 2018, Smith was signed to the New England Patriots' practice squad.

New York Jets
On December 18, 2018, Smith was signed by the New York Jets off the Patriots practice squad. He was waived on August 31, 2019.

New York Giants
On September 1, 2019, Smith was claimed off waivers by the New York Giants.

On September 5, 2020, Smith was waived by the Giants.

Dallas Cowboys
On September 9, 2020, Smith was signed to the Dallas Cowboys practice squad. He was elevated to the active roster on September 19 and September 26 for the team's weeks 2 and 3 games against the Atlanta Falcons and Seattle Seahawks, and reverted to the practice squad after each game. He signed a reserve/future contract with the Cowboys on January 4, 2021.

On August 31, 2021, Smith was waived by the Cowboys.

Arizona Cardinals
On September 7, 2021, Smith was signed to the Arizona Cardinals practice squad. He signed a reserve/future contract with the Cardinals on January 19, 2022. He was waived on August 4, 2022.

New York Giants (second stint)
On August 7, 2022, the New York Giants signed Smith. He was waived on August 29.

New York Jets (second stint)
On September 6, 2022, Smith signed with the practice squad of the New York Jets. He was released on October 18.

Tennessee Titans
On October 24, 2022, Smith was signed to the Tennessee Titans practice squad. He was released on November 15. He was re-signed to the practice squad six days later. On December 6, the Titans released Smith.

New York Jets (third stint)
On December 14, 2022, Smith was signed to the New York Jets practice squad. He was promoted to the active roster on January 7, 2023.

References

External links
Virginia Cavaliers bio 

1995 births
Living people
People from Decatur, Georgia
Players of American football from Georgia (U.S. state)
Sportspeople from DeKalb County, Georgia
Virginia Cavaliers football players
Miami Dolphins players
New England Patriots players
New York Giants players
New York Jets players
Dallas Cowboys players
Arizona Cardinals players
Tennessee Titans players